Meškuičiai is a town in Šiauliai County in northern-central Lithuania. According to a 2011 census it had a population of 1,056.

References

Towns in Lithuania
Towns in Šiauliai County